Bahram Kosh-e Mirza (also Romanized as Bahrām Kosh-e Mīrzā and Bahrām Kosh Mīrzā; also known as Bahrām Kosh) is a village in Koregah-e Sharqi Rural District, in the Central District of Khorramabad County, Lorestan Province, Iran. At the 2006 census, its population was 30, in 5 families.

References 

Towns and villages in Khorramabad County